The Kyiv Academic Style of Bandura Playing is a method of playing the Ukrainian folk instrument of bandura.

The instrument is held between the knees perpendicular to the body of the player. This means that the left hand is only able to play easily along the bass strings of the instrument.  The right hand usually plays just on the treble strings known as prystrunky.

The manner in which the instrument is held influences the technique used by the bandurist. The left hand uses only the middle three fingers in play. The position in which the bandura is held also means that the 5th finger of the right hand cannot be used effectively.

The Kyiv style is based on the technique used by kobzari of the Chernihiv province such as Tereshko Parkhomenko. It became known as the Kyiv style because the Kyiv Bandurist Capella used it. Before World War II, most Kyiv banduras had diatonically tuned bass strings. Since World War II in Ukraine, chromatic bass tuning is the standard. In the West, however, groups of bandurists exist that adhere to a diatonic bass tuning. Often these bandurists will refer to their playing style as the Chernihiv style of playing the bandura.

See also

Kharkiv style

References
 Diakowsky, M. - A Note on the History of the Bandura. The Annals of the Ukrainian Academy of Arts and Sciences in the U.S. - 4, 3-4 No.1419, N.Y. 1958 - С.21-22
 Diakowsky, M. J. - The Bandura. The Ukrainian Trend, 1958, No.I,  - С.18-36
 Diakowsky, M. – Anyone can make a bandura – I did.  The Ukrainian Trend, Volume 6
 Haydamaka, L. – Kobza-bandura – National Ukrainian Musical Instrument. "Guitar Review" No.33, Summer 1970 (С.13-18)
 Hornjatkevyč, A. – The book of Kodnia and the three Bandurists.  Bandura, #11-12, 1985
 Hornjatkevyč A. J., Nichols T. R. - The Bandura.  Canada crafts, April–May, 1979 p. 28-29
 Mishalow, V. - A Brief Description of the Zinkiv Method of Bandura Playing. Bandura, 1982, No.2/6, - С.23-26
 Mishalow, V.  - The Kharkiv style #1. Bandura 1982, No.6, - С.15-22 #2 – Bandura 1985, No.13-14, - С.20-23 #3 – Bandura 1988, No.23-24, - С.31-34 #4 – Bandura 1987, No.19-20, - С.31-34 #5 – Bandura 1987, No.21-22, - С.34-35
 Mishalow, V. - A Short History of the Bandura. East European Meetings in Ethnomusicology 1999, Romanian Society for Ethnomusicology, Volume 6, - С.69-86
 Mizynec, V. - Folk Instruments of Ukraine. Bayda Books, Melbourne, Australia, 1987 - 48с.
 Cherkaskyi, L. - Ukrainski narodni muzychni instrumenty. Tekhnika, Kyiv, Ukraine, 2003 - 262 pages. 

Kobzarstvo